Lawson N. Robertson (September 23, 1883 – January 22, 1951) was born in Aberdeen, Scotland, and died in Philadelphia, Pennsylvania.
He was a member of and trainer for the Irish American Athletic Club, and competed for the U.S. Olympic Team at the 1904 Summer Olympics in St. Louis,  at the 1906 Intercalated Games in Athens, and at the 1908 Summer Olympics in London.

Athletic career
In 1904 he won the bronze medal in the standing high jump competition. In the 100 metres event he finished sixth. He also participated in the 60 metres competition where he was eliminated in the first round. Two years later at the Intercalated Games he won the silver medal in the standing high jump event and the bronze medal in the standing long jump competition. In the 100 metres event he finished fifth and in the pentathlon contest he finished sixth. He also participated in the 400 metres competition but did not start in the repechage.

In the 100 metres competition at the 1908 Olympics, Robertson won his first round heat with a time of 11.4 seconds to advance to the semifinals. There, he lost a close race to countryman Nathaniel Cartmell, both clocking at 11.2 seconds and Cartmell winning by about a foot. The loss to Cartmell eliminated Robertson from advancing to the final. On the same day as his semifinal loss in the 100 meters, Robertson was eliminated in the preliminary heats of the 200 metres with a second-place finish in his heat. His time was 23.0 seconds, 0.2 slower than the winner's. He also participated again in the standing high jump competition but his result is unknown.

On November 28, 1909, Robertson was badly burned in an accident at Celtic Park, in Queens, New York when a ladle of hot lead exploded in his face. Robertson was preparing to pour the molten lead for a  shot which was to be used in the shot put by Martin Sheridan and John Flanagan at the annual field day of the Second Regiment of the Irish Volunteers. The shot was determined to be a few ounces under weight, so a hole was bored in it and the lead was poured inside to bring the weight to the required mark. Robertson was standing over the ladle when some water dropped into the lead, causing an explosion which burned Robertson's face and neck. "Fortunately he had his eyes close tightly, and they were not injured. The flesh about his eyes and face was burned and the lead burned his clothes." After Robertson was rushed to a doctor, the Irish Whales of the Irish American Athletic Club proceeded with the competition, and Martin Sheridan set a world's record with the very same weight, putting the shot , three and half inches further than the long-standing record of fellow Irishman James Mitchell.

Later life

In 1928, at the Olympic Games in Amsterdam, Robertson served as the head coach for the U.S. Olympic track and field team. Reflecting on the controversial 1908 Olympics, Robertson said: "Probably England was not as charitably inclined toward the American champions as she might have been, and it is equally true that the victorious Americans were not as modest as they should have been." According to his 1910 trading card, Lawson "will go down in athletic history as one of the greatest sprinters of the cinder path."

Lawson became embroiled in controversy in the 1936 Olympics when his last-minute decision to pull Sam Stoller and Marty Glickman, the only two Jews on the U.S. track team, led to widespread speculation that U.S. Olympic Committee chairman Avery Brundage had ordered the move to avoid further embarrassment to Adolf Hitler should two American Jews win gold medals.

Portrayals in film
 He is portrayed by Tony Curran in the 2016 biographical sports film Race.

Notes

References

External links
 
 
 

1883 births
1951 deaths
American male long jumpers
American male high jumpers
American male sprinters
Athletes (track and field) at the 1904 Summer Olympics
Athletes (track and field) at the 1906 Intercalated Games
Athletes (track and field) at the 1908 Summer Olympics
Olympic silver medalists for the United States in track and field
Olympic bronze medalists for the United States in track and field
Medalists at the 1904 Summer Olympics
Medalists at the 1906 Intercalated Games
Olympic coaches
Sportspeople from Aberdeen
USA Outdoor Track and Field Championships winners
British emigrants to the United States